Pantea Rahmani (born 10 September 1971, in Tehran) is a contemporary Iranian artist, known for her self-portraits.

Life 
Rahmani was born on 10 September 1971 in Tehran, Iran. She studied visual art at the Fine Department of the Art at University of Tehran and in 1999, she graduated with a B.F.A in Painting and Drawing.

Work 
Rahmani often uses dark and acherontic shades of grey for her self portraits on large canvas.

Both of her Tehran pictures and her "NO.7", were shown at a 2012 solo exhibition called "The Seismic Sanctuary" at the Salsali Private Museum in Dubai. 
Rahmani has had exhibitions at Iranian art galleries and museums such as Niavaran Cultural Center, and The Museum of contemporary Arts. She also has participated in exhibitions such as Dessin, Drawing exhibition in Kyoto University of Arts & Design, Japan and CROQU'ART (women's movements) in Brussels, Belgium.

See also 

 List of Iranian women artists

References

External links 
Official website

1971 births
Living people
21st-century Iranian painters
21st-century Iranian women artists
Iranian women painters
University of Tehran alumni
People from Tehran